Low Gap is an unincorporated community in Boone County, West Virginia, United States.

The community was named for a low mountain pass near the original town site.

References 

Unincorporated communities in West Virginia
Unincorporated communities in Boone County, West Virginia